Sääksjärvi is a lake in Kokemäki, Satakunta, western Finland, east from the town of Pori. The lake is notable because it overlies an impact crater.

The age of the impact structure is estimated to be about 543 ± 12 Ma (million years ago), at the boundary between the Ediacaran and Cambrian periods. There are impactite rocks in the southwestern region from the crater confirming its extraterrestrial origin. At the time of its discovery, only one impact crater (Lappajärvi) was known in Finland.

See also
Impact craters in Finland

References

External links
 
 Sääksjärvi impact structure

Impact craters of Finland
Proterozoic impact craters
Kokemäenjoki basin
Lakes of Kokemäki
Impact crater lakes